Anesthesiology, a monthly peer-reviewed medical journal founded in 1940, leads the world in publication of peer-reviewed novel research that transforms clinical practice and fundamental understanding in anesthesiology: the practice of perioperative, critical care, and pain medicine. Anesthesiology is the official journal of the American Society of Anesthesiologists but operates with complete editorial autonomy. With an independent and internationally recognized editorial board, the Journal leads the specialty in promotion of original research by providing immediate open access to highlighted articles and free access to all published articles 6 months after publication. Anesthesiology is committed to publishing and disseminating the highest quality work to inform daily clinical practice and transform the practice of medicine in our specialty.

The editor-in-chief is Evan Kharasch (Duke University). It is published by Lippincott Williams & Wilkins on behalf of the American Society of Anesthesiologists.

According to the Journal Citation Reports, the journal has a 2019 impact factor of 7.067, ranking it 1st out of 32 journals in the category Anesthesiology.

References

External links 
 

Lippincott Williams & Wilkins academic journals
Anesthesiology and palliative medicine journals
Publications established in 1940
Monthly journals
English-language journals